nogaholding is a semi-independent agency within the Ministry of Oil and Gas in the nation of Bahrain whose mission is to develop the nation's petroleum resources. Established in 2007 as a unit of the National Oil and Gas Authority (NOGA), the government's petroleum regulator, it became an independent agency when NOGA was abolished in September 2021.

Agency overview
Nogaholding was established in August 2007 as a subsidiary unit of the National Oil and Gas Authority (NOGA), the Government of Bahrain's petroleum industry regulator. Nogaholding was intended to concentrate and refocus NOGA's oil, gas, and petrochemical development activities. NOGA was abolished in September 2021. Nogaholding became a semi-independent agency within Bahrain's Ministry of Oil and Gas.

As of 2022, nogaholding owned two corporate subsidiaries and had assets of more than US$10.2 billion.

Corporate history
In December 2015, nogaholding signed an agreement with Teekay Corp., a Canadian-based petroleum shipping firm, to build a liquified natural gas (LNG) import terminal in Bahrain. To fund this project, nogaholding issued US$570 million in sukuk (bonds which are sharia-compliant) in March 2016. Some of the funds were also used for modernization projects at Bahrain Petroleum Company (BAPCO) and at Bahrain's natural gas processing plant. Nogaholding formed a joint venture, Bahrain LNG, to operate the LNG terminal, in which Teekay held a 30 percent interest, and Samsung and GIC each held another 20 percent. A US$98.7 million contract was signed in October 2016 with JGC Corp. of Japan to build a new storage and pipeline facility at the natural gas processing facility.

The LNG terminal, located at the city of Al Hidd, opened in May 2019. The terminal consisted of a Floating Storage Unit (FSU) constructed and modified by Teekay, a breakwater and receiving jetty, a regasification platform, a pipeline to bring natural gas onshore from the regasification platform, an onshore gas storage facility, and a nitrogen production plant.

Nogaholding raised another US$1 billion in sukuk in October 2018.

In November 2020, Bahrain adopted a strategy for supplying homes, industry, and government buildings with natural gas. The strategy called for the construction of a national natural gas grid and for the construction of pipelines with other Gulf Cooperation Council member nations to supply the grid with gas. Nogaholding signed an agreement with Chevron Corporation to jointly study the nation's future natural gas needs and from where Bahrain should obtain supplies. The same month, nogaholding contracted with Air Products, an American corporation, to study how Bahrain could move to a hydrogen economy.

Shaikh Nasser bin Hamad Al Khalifa was appointed chairman of the board of nogaholding in April 2021. Managing Director Mohamed bin Mubarak Bin Daina told the press in October 2021 that Shaikh Nasser was leading the agency away from being a purely oil and gas developer and toward becoming an integrated energy corporation.

By 2022, nogaholding was studying the possibility of allowing foreign investment in its oil and gas assets, or engaging in an initial public offering. The agency hired a consultant and a financial advisor to assist it with this aspect of Bahrain's national energy strategy.

Nogaholding raised US$600 million in sukuk in April 2021, and another US$2.2 billion in murabaha (a sharia-compliant bond similar to a cost-plus pricing agreement) in May 2022. About US$1.6 billion was used to refinance older debt. This was the first time nogaholding had issued sustainability-linked financing instruments. The murabaha was linked to greenhouse gas emissions and workplace injury reduction targets.

Nogaholding reported 2020 revenues of BD1.643 billion (about US$4.357 billion), down from BD2.670 billion in 2019. Total assets in 2020 were BD4.055 billion, up from BD3.719 billion in 2019, and total equity was BD1.216 billion, down from BD1.351 billion in 2019.

Subsidiaries
nogaholding's subsidiaries include the Bahrain Petroleum Company (BAPCO), Bahrain National Gas Company (Banagas), Bahrain Aviation Fueling Company (Bafco), Bahrain Lube Base Oil Company (Blboc), Tatweer Petroleum Company, Bahrain LNG, Bahrain Gasoline Blending, BAC Jet Fuel Company, Gulf Petrochemical Industries Company, and Arab Shipbuilding and Repair Yard Bahrain.

References
Notes

Citations

Government agencies of Bahrain
Subnational energy ministries
National oil and gas companies
Oil and gas companies of Bahrain